Forte de São Tiago das Cinco Pontas is a fort located in Recife, Pernambuco in Brazil.

See also
Military history of Brazil

References

External links

Sao Tiago
Buildings and structures in Recife
Portuguese colonial architecture in Brazil